Percy Walter Vasey (29 July 1883 – 11 September 1952) played first-class cricket in one match for Somerset in the 1913 season. In the 1900s, he had played Minor Counties cricket for Hertfordshire. He was born at Highbury, London and died at Upton Hellions, Crediton, Devon.

Educated at the Merchant Taylors' School, Vasey became a schoolmaster at King's School, Bruton. Unusually to modern eyes, he was a successful member of the school hockey and cricket teams and a reproduction in 2008 of the 1908 edition of The Dolphin, the King's Bruton school magazine, shows a fair-haired mustachioed man as a member of both the unbeaten football team and as a gown-wearing teacher in the school photograph. Vasey returned to King's Bruton as a master after the First World War and was a housemaster.

As a cricketer, Vasey was a right-handed middle-order batsman and a right-arm slow bowler, though he did not bowl in either Minor Counties or first-class cricket. He played twice for Hertfordshire in 1906, making 31 in the innings victory over Oxfordshire. In minor cricket in 1911, he scored 282 for the Old Brutonians team against Sidmouth, sharing a second wicket partnership of 396 with Harold Hippisley, who made 150. His one first-class match came in 1913, and he made 10 and 3 in the match against Yorkshire at Bath, in which Hippisley also played. As late as 1931 he was playing for Old Brutonians in club matches.

Vasey served in the First World War with the Dorset Regiment; he was transferred from active service to the Ministry of National Service in 1917 with the rank of captain.

References

1883 births
1952 deaths
English cricketers
Somerset cricketers
Hertfordshire cricketers
People educated at Merchant Taylors' School, Northwood
Dorset Regiment officers
British Army personnel of World War I
Military personnel from London